Shirley Samuels is an American academic. She is the Litwin Professor of American Studies as well as the current director of American Studies at Cornell University and is known for her work on American literature and culture.

Education and career 
Samuels has a B.A. (1977), M.A. (1981), and Ph.D. (1986) from the University of California, Berkeley. Following her Ph.D. she was an assistant professor at Princeton University until she moved to Cornell University in 1986 where she was promoted to full professor in 1998. From 2000 until 2001 she was the Fletcher Brown Professor of Humanities at the University of Delaware. From 2009 until 2015, she chaired the History of Art Department, and from 2009 until 2012 she was dean of the Flora Rose House on the Cornell University campus.

Samuels' work includes visual studies where she focuses on challenges with photographic representation of the American Civil War.

Awards and honors
In 1988 Samuels was a fellow at the American Antiquarian Society in the Northeast Modern Language Association (NEMLA) division. She has also had fellowships from the American Council of Learned Societies, the Society for the Humanities, and the Library Company of Philadelphia. In 2015-2016, she was the Los Angeles Times distinguished fellow at the Huntington Library. In 2020 she was named a Quarry Farm Fellow by the Center For Mark Twain Studies.

Selected publications

References

External links 
 Cornell University bio
 

Living people
University of California, Berkeley alumni
Cornell University faculty
American Antiquarian Society members
Women writers (early modern)
University of Delaware faculty
Year of birth missing (living people)